Lithuania is scheduled to compete at the 2017 World Aquatics Championships in Budapest, Hungary from 14 July to 30 July.

Competitors
The following is the list of number of competitors participating at the Championships per discipline.

Diving

Lithuania has entered 2 female divers.

Women

Swimming

Lithuanian swimmers have achieved qualifying standards in the following events (up to a maximum of 2 swimmers in each event at the A-standard entry time, and 1 at the B-standard): Nine of them (seven men and two women) have been selected to compete at the World Championships, including freestyle sprinter and Rio 2016 top eight finalist Simonas Bilis and breaststroker and current world record holder Rūta Meilutytė.

Men

Women

References

Nations at the 2017 World Aquatics Championships
2017 in Lithuanian sport
Lithuania at the World Aquatics Championships